During the 2006–07 English football season, Leeds United F.C. competed in the Football League Championship.

Season summary
The 2006–07 season started badly with Leeds conceding late goals in several matches, and in September 2006 Blackwell's contract as manager of Leeds United was terminated. Leeds hired John Carver as caretaker manager but his spell was not a success. Carver was relieved of his duties and Dennis Wise was eventually installed as his replacement after a month without a permanent manager. Defender Matthew Kilgallon left in January to join Sheffield United, and the team never succeeded in escaping the relegation zone after a 5–1 thumping by Luton Town in late October, despite Wise bringing a number of experienced loan players and free transfers on short-term deals into the squad. Results did begin to improve as the season drew to an end, but relegation rivals Hull City and Queens Park Rangers went on even better runs at the same time, and this combined with Leeds's awful goal difference made survival all but impossible. With relegation virtually assured, Leeds entered a Company Voluntary Arrangement (administration) on 4 May 2007, thus incurring a league imposed 10-point deduction which officially relegated the club to the third tier of English football.

Final league table

Results
Leeds United's score comes first

Legend

Football League Championship

FA Cup

League Cup

First-team squad
Squad at end of season

Left club during season

Reserve squad

References

Leeds United
Leeds United F.C. seasons
Foot